Brimley Halt was a railway station open in 1928 by the Great Western Railway (GWR) to serve the village of Brimley that lies between Bovey Tracey and Ilsington in South Devon, England. It had a single platform and was located on a curved section of track without a passing loop or sidings. A special train to Bovey Tracey visited Brimley Halt on 5 July 1970, its last known use by a passenger train. The track had been lifted by 8 September 1975.

The site of the station was destroyed by the construction of a new A382 road along the course of the trackbed.

References
Notes

Sources
 Butt, R. V. J. (1995). The Directory of Railway Stations: details every public and private passenger station, halt, platform and stopping place, past and present (1st ed.). Sparkford: Patrick Stephens Ltd. . OCLC 60251199.
 Kingdom, Anthony. R.; Lang, Mike (2004). The Newton Abbot to Moretonhampstead Railway. Liverton, Newton Abbot: Forest Publishing. .

Railway stations in Great Britain opened in 1928
Disused railway stations in Devon
Former Great Western Railway stations
Railway stations in Great Britain closed in 1959
Bovey Tracey